A penumbral lunar eclipse took place on Friday, March 13, 1998, the first of three lunar eclipses in 1998.

Visibility

Related eclipses

Eclipses of 1998 
 A total solar eclipse on February 26.
 A penumbral lunar eclipse on March 13.
 A penumbral lunar eclipse on August 8.
 An annular solar eclipse on August 22.
 A penumbral lunar eclipse on September 6.

Lunar year series 

This is the last of four lunar year eclipses at the ascending node of the moon's orbit.

Half-Saros cycle
A lunar eclipse will be preceded and followed by solar eclipses by 9 years and 5.5 days (a half saros). This lunar eclipse is related to two partial solar eclipses of Solar Saros 149.

Tzolkinex 
 Preceded: Lunar eclipse of January 30, 1991

 Followed: Lunar eclipse of April 24, 2005

See also 
List of lunar eclipses
List of 20th-century lunar eclipses

References

External links 
 Saros cycle 142
 

1998-03
1998 in science
March 1998 events